South Side High School is a public high school in Greene Township, Pennsylvania, United States.  It is the only high school in the South Side Area School District. Athletic teams compete as the South Side Rams in the Western Pennsylvania Interscholastic Athletic League.

Notes and references

External links
 District Website

Public high schools in Pennsylvania
Schools in Beaver County, Pennsylvania
Education in Pittsburgh area